Bharati Vidyapeeth is a 58 year old private deemed to be university established in Pune, India. It was established in 1964 by Indian politician and educationist Patangrao Kadam. Bharati Vidyapeeth has campuses across the country at New Delhi, Navi Mumbai, Sangli, Pune, Solapur, Kolhapur, Karad, Satara, and Panchgani. Among these are colleges of Medicine, Dentistry, Ayurveda, Homeopathy, Nursing, Pharmacy, Engineering, Management, Hotel Management, Catering Technology, Environment Science and Agriculture etc. On 26 April 1996 the Government of India, on the recommendation of the University Grants Commission, granted the status of "Deemed to be University" to a cluster of 12 institutions of Bharati Vidyapeeth.

Rankings 

The National Institutional Ranking Framework (NIRF) ranked Bharati Vidyapeeth 76th among universities for 2022. 
The universities constituent engineering college, Bharati Vidyapeeth Deemed University College of Engineering, Pune was ranked 131 in India by the NIRF engineering ranking for 2022. 

Bharati Vidyapeeth's College of Pharmacy was ranked 17 in India by the National Institutional Ranking Framework (NIRF) pharmacy ranking in 2021.

Notable alumni
Shaheer Sheikh  
Pravin Tarde  
Saurabh Bharadwaj

References

External links
 Bharati Vidyapeeth

Universities and colleges in Pune
Deemed universities in Maharashtra
Educational institutions established in 1964
1964 establishments in Maharashtra